Pastrana (IPA: [pɐs'trana]), officially the Municipality of Pastrana, is a 5th class municipality in the province of Leyte, Philippines. According to the 2020 census, it has a population of 19,359 people.

History 

Prior to incorporation as a separate municipality, Pastrana was part of the municipality of Dagami.

Before the coming of the Spaniards, the settlement was called "Pamagpagan" because of the way the native inhabitants left their hair in disarray. In 1891, Captain Wenceslao Nielo, with the aid of a Spanish Franciscan friar by the name of Fr. Eusebio Ibanez, organized the settlement into a town and was transferred from Guinbaya-an to its present site. Father Ibanez blessed it with a holy mass. As a token of gratitude, the inhabitants called the town "Pastrana" in honor of Fr. Ibanez who was a native of Pastrana, Spain.

Shortly afterwards, parochial schools were established. At this time, the unit of local administration was the pueblo which embraced a number of barrios. The first gobernadorcillo was Captain Wenceslao Nielo. He was assisted in the administration of the pueblo by the "Guinhaupan," a group of men equivalent to the present councilors, by the "tenientes" and by the "Cabezas de barangay."

When the Philippine revolution broke out in 1898, the people fled to the mountains and for a time, the local government then headed by Andres Villablanca, was temporarily suspended. It was at this moment in the history of the town that Jorge Capili, a guerrilla leader, burned the whole town. By the year 1901, Gregorio Marquez was appointed municipal president. The Americans who occupied the whole country, stationed a detachment at Dagami. They came once in a while to Pastrana to look after the affairs of the little town. In 1903, the town was reverted into a barrio of Dagami due to inadequate finances.

Pastrana for a time remained a barrio of Dagami. In 1912, Agaton Villablanca worked for the establishment of the barrio to a municipality so that its former status was finally regained. In gratitude, the people appointed Agaton Villablanca president. After five years when the first municipal election was held, Agaton Villablanca retained his leadership of the municipal government.

When the Japanese occupied Pastrana in 1942, the people secretly fled to the mountains. The incumbent mayor also evacuated and his elder brother took his place. The Japanese did not stay long. The guerillas burned down the buildings and for some time there were no Japanese in the town. But in 1943, the Japanese returned, this time for long, for the soldiers constructed a garrison. The Japanese invaders ordered the civilians to live in the town proper. For two long years, the town residents suffered severely under the Japanese oppression.

In 1944 when the American liberation forces drove out the Japanese, Francisco Villablanca, who was the pre-war mayor, automatically resumed his position and under him, the town was restored to its former status as a peaceful community.

At present, Pastrana is fast progressing in the agricultural field because of the biggest gravity irrigation system in eastern Visayas, located at Barrio Tingib, lacing the whole municipality with irrigation canals. A direct road to Palo as well as feeder roads have been constructed. The Binaha-an Dam provides an ideal picnic site with the stately Amandawing mountain in the background.

Geography
Sometimes referred to as the "land of the fairies," Pastrana is an interior town of the province.

Its rice fields and coconut plantations are the main assets of the place. The climate is cool and the soil fertile.

The water system at Tingib is designed to supply Tacloban and neighboring municipalities.

Barangays
Pastrana is politically subdivided into 29 barangays.

Climate

Demographics

Economy

References

External links
 [ Philippine Standard Geographic Code]
Philippine Census Information
Local Governance Performance Management System

Municipalities of Leyte (province)